Gabriela Goddzer is a fictional character in the 2012 Argentine telenovela Graduados. She is played by Violeta Urtizberea.

Character creation
Mex Urtizberea and Violeta Urtizberea are father and daughter. Violeta began to work in the series ignoring that they were both in cast, and requested to have her own space in it. As a result, their characters have very limited joint scenes.

Awards
Violeta Urtizberea has been nominated for the 2012 Tato awards for her work with the character.

References

Graduados characters
Fictional Argentine Jews
Fictional Jewish women
Fictional secretaries
Television characters introduced in 2012